Kuttanadan Marpappa is a 2018 Indian Malayalam-language romantic comedy film written and directed by Sreejith Vijayan. The cast includes Kunchacko Boban, Surabhi Santosh, Aditi Ravi, Innocent, Ramesh Pisharody, and Dharmajan Bolgatty. Kuttanadan Marpappa was released in India on 29 March 2018.

Plot
John Paul, known to the natives as "Marpappa" is a photographer from Karuvatta, Alappuzha, living with his mother Mary, who runs a ration shop. His father had committed suicide by jumping into backwaters during John's childhood. John developed aquaphobia after seeing his father's dead body, and thus he has not learnt to swim, despite living near backwaters.

Jessy is the daughter of Panchayat president Oomachan and is a BDS final year student. She is saved by John from an attempted suicide after failing in the final exam. Jessy and John get to know each other and ends up in a romantic relationship. John helps Jessy to produce a fake degree certificate by taking a mortgage loan to meet the expense. Later, Jessy breaks up with John after getting a marriage proposal from wealthy fashion photographer Peter and realising that John's income would not match her needs. After, she goes abroad for a job.

Jessy returns to the homeland and her marriage with Peter is being arranged. In the meantime, Jessy had found out that Peter is actually an erotic photographer. She extorts money from his father in exchange for not exposing Peter. It is revealed that Peter had already known about her fake certificate and intimidate her when she tries to break up with him. Meanwhile, the bank forecloses John's home.

John later pretends that he is still in love with Jessy and finally with her help, John retains his residential documents from the bank. John finally confesses that he cannot maintain a relationship with Jessy as she changes her color as per the situations.
Jessy has no other choice other than to marry Peter as Peter knows everything about Jessy, including her fake certificate, illegal immigration and illegal job claim in London.

Meanwhile, John and Jessy's younger sister Annie falls in love. John marries Annie on the same day as Jessi marries Peter.

Later in the movie, it is revealed that Fr. Innocent who performed both the marriages was betrayed by Jessi in their school days & John's mother Mrs. Mary was the mastermind behind John and Annie's marriage.

Cast

Kunchacko Boban as John Paul a.k.a. Marpappa
Dharmajan Bolgatty as Motta, John's friend
Surabhi Santosh as Annie, Jessy's sister & John's wife 
Aditi Ravi as Dr.Jessy, John's lover
Shanthi Krishna as Mary, John's mother
Ramesh Pisharody as Peter, Jessy's husband
Jaya Menon as Ummachan's wife 
Mallika Sukumaran as Peter's Grandmother
Aju Varghese as Fr. Innocent
Innocent as Ummachan, Jessy's father
Hareesh Perumanna as Cleetus
Tini Tom as Thomachan
Salim Kumar as Philipose
Soubin Shahir as Freddy
V. K. Prakash as Peter's father
Sunil Sukhada as Vicar
Gourav Menon as Young John
Adhish Praveen as Young Motta
Aneesh Ravi as Joseph
Suresh Thampanoor as Villager
Rajeev Rajan as Cameraman
Sohan Seenulal as ICD Card Executive
Sibi Thomas as Police officer
Binu Adimali as Mathayi
Sunil Babu as Villager
Sasi Kalinga as Pappichen
Nadirshah as Doctor
Kochu Preman as Peter's relative
Dinesh Prabhakar as Peter's friend
Noby Marcose as Brittas
Sajan Palluruthy as Abu
Kollam Sudhi
Vinod Kedamangalam as Politician
Ullas Pandalam as Police constable
Swasika as Jinu
Kulappulli Leela as Motta's mother
 Manju Sunichen as Minimol
Deepika Mohan as Janaki's mother
Molly Kanamaly as Villager
Sarath Thenumoola as Sayippu(Foreigner).

Production
The shoot commenced at Kodanad, Alappuzha and nearby places in late November 2017. Kuttanadan Marpappa is the directorial debut of cinematographer Sreejith Vijayan. Shanthi Krishna plays a single mother in the film. The film's songs were composed Rahul Raj, lyrics were written by Rajeev Alunkal and Vinayan Shasikumar.Raveena Ravi dubbed for Aditi Ravi & Angel Shijoy for Surabhi Santhosh.

Release
The film was released in India on 29 March 2018.

Reception

The Times of India gave the film 3 out of 5 and stated: "Kuttanadan Marpappa is a perfect family entertainer". The chemistry between the actors, the background score and flawless direction are the plus points. Manorama Online gave it 3 out of 5 and wrote: "The mid-speed entertainer in the family-comedy genre keeps the audience glued to the seats". DGZ Media said that " The film is a complete package with the stunning visuals, the lovely performances of the lead actors and the comedy". Dekh News said that "This film is great in so many senses such as acting, production, and direction. It has a great screenplay and we are sure that you all are going to love it".

Box office
The film grossed  8.10 crore in less than a month from Kerala box office, with a distributor's share of 3.58 crore.

References

External links
 

2010s Malayalam-language films
2018 romantic comedy films
Indian romantic comedy films
Films shot in Alappuzha
Films scored by Rahul Raj